Hovea pannosa is a species of flowering shrub in the family Fabaceae and is endemic to Australia. It is a small, erect shrub with purple pea flowers and stiff green leaves.

Description
Flowering occurs from August to September and the fruit is a sessile pod moderately covered with rusty coloured hairs.

Taxonomy and naming
Hovea pannosa was first formally described in 1851 by Allan Cunningham and the description was published in Botanical Magazine. The specific epithet (pannosa) means "felt-like".

Distribution
This species grows in dry, rocky, sclerophyll forests south of the Blue Mountains in New South Wales and in the East Gippsland in Victoria.

References

pannosa
Flora of New South Wales
Flora of Victoria (Australia)
Fabales of Australia
Taxa named by Allan Cunningham (botanist)